The 1973 Tirreno–Adriatico was the eighth edition of the Tirreno–Adriatico cycle race and was held from 13 March to 17 March 1973. The race started in Ostia and finished in San Benedetto del Tronto. The race was won by Roger De Vlaeminck.

General classification

References

1973
1973 in Italian sport